Ursula Wood may refer to:

 Ursula Vaughan Williams (1911–2007), English poet and author, previously Ursula Wood
 Ursula Wood (artist) (1868–1925), British artist and illustrator